Computación y Sistemas is a  peer-reviewed on Artificial Intelligence and Computing Science research providing a recognized forum for research in the area of computer science at Latin America. It was established in 1997 by Professor Adolfo Guzmán Arenas and it is published by Instituto Politécnico Nacional with the support of CONACyT.

Abstracting and indexing 

The journal is abstracted and indexed in DBLP, Scielo, and Scopus.

Computación y Sistemas is included in the CONACyT   until 2017.

Open Access Policy 

Computación y Sistemas provides immediate open access to its peer-reviewed content.

Former Editors in Chief 

 Juan Humberto Sosa Azuela (IPN), Isaac Scherson (University of California, Irvine) & Ulises Cortés (KEMLg-UPC) (2009–2012)
 Juan Luis Díaz de León (IPN), Jean Paul Frédéric Serra (Centre de Morphologie Mathématique) & Gerhard X. Ritter (University of Florida)  (2004–2009)
 George A. Bekey (USC), Juan Luis Díaz de León (IPN), Jean Paul Frédéric Serra (Centre de Morphologie Mathématique), Gerhard X. Ritter (University of Florida) & Adolfo Steiger Garçao (New University of Lisbon) (2003–2004)
 George A. Bekey (USC), Adolfo Guzmán Arenas (IPN), Ramón López de Mántaras (CSIC) & Adolfo Steiger Garçao (New University of Lisbon) (1997 -2003)

References

External links 

  CONACyT registry of excellence magazinesEvaluation Criteria 
 http://scielo.unam.mx/scielo.php/script_sci_serial/pid_1405-5546/lng_en/nrm_iso

Computación y Sistemas 

English-language journals
Quarterly journals